Mário Barroso (born 15 August 1947) is a Portuguese film director, actor and cinematographer born in Lisbon.

External links
 

1947 births
Portuguese film directors
Portuguese male film actors
Portuguese cinematographers
Living people
People from Lisbon